Mahogany is a 1975 American romantic drama film directed by Berry Gordy and produced by Motown Productions. The Motown founder Gordy took over the film direction after British filmmaker Tony Richardson was dismissed from the film. Mahogany stars Diana Ross as Tracy Chambers, a struggling fashion design student who rises to become a popular fashion designer in Rome. It was released on October 8, 1975. The soundtrack included the single "Theme from Mahogany (Do You Know Where You're Going To)", which peaked at number-one on the Billboard Hot 100 chart in January 1976.

Plot 
Tracy Chambers dreams of becoming a fashion designer and has worked her way up to assistant to the head buyer at a luxury department store (modeled after and filmed at Marshall Fields on State Street) in Chicago. Her supervisor, Miss Evans, believes that Tracy's night school courses will interfere with her responsibilities at the store. Her aunt, however, encourages her and visits prospective buyers, who tell Tracy her designs are good for Paris, but not for Chicago.

One evening, she gets into a shouting match with Brian Walker, a local activist fighting against gentrification in their community.

Sean McAvoy, a great fashion photographer, comes to the department store to photograph models, all of whom are white, and with whom he is dissatisfied. Sean mistakes Tracy for a new model and creates an impromptu shoot with her, featuring a rainbow-colored gown made by her aunt. As Sean prepares to leave Chicago, he invites Tracy to Rome.

Tracy again encounters Brian during her walk to work and surreptitiously pours milk into his bullhorn's mouthpiece. Brian assumes that one of the construction workers has played a prank on him and a fight begins. Brian is arrested and Tracy bails him out. He insists that he will return the money. She tells him to put it in her door's mail slot, which he does. Brian becomes her boyfriend, but the relationship does not last long as Brian does not support Tracy's aspirations.

Sean reinvents Tracy as "Mahogany" and she becomes among the most in-demand fashion models. An uneasy relationship develops with Sean, who is possessive and jealous of anyone vying for Tracy's attention, which includes Brian when he visits. Tracy, feeling she owes Sean for her new career, reluctantly agrees to sleep with him. Sean's implied latent homosexuality makes the union a failure. Brian fails to persuade Tracy to return home with him to support him in his political aspirations.

During their next photo shoot on an elevated highway in an expensive sports car, Sean causes an accident in which he's killed and Tracy sustains severe injuries. A new benefactor, Count Christian Rosetti, lends Tracy his villa for her recovery and a studio space in which she may finally create her own fashion label. Because of the tremendous job pressures, Tracy becomes demanding and cruel to her employees. She is unwilling to express her appreciation to her new benefactor by becoming his mistress. She finds her career emotionally empty and not what she dreamed it would be without Brian's love and support. Following the tremendous success of her first collection, Tracy realizes that she must decide whether to continue with her empty life in Rome or return to the man she loves in Chicago, and use her talents to boost his political prospects.

Cast
 Diana Ross as Tracy Chambers
 Billy Dee Williams as Brian Walker
 Anthony Perkins as Sean McAvoy
 Jean-Pierre Aumont as Count Christian Rosetti
 Beah Richards as Florence
 Nina Foch as Miss Evans
 Marisa Mell as Carlotta Gavina
 Lenard Norris as Wil
 Jerome Arnold as Campaign Worker
 Pemon Rami as Campaign Worker
 Obelo as Campaign Worker
 Ira Rogers as Stalker
 Kristine Cameron as Instructress
 Ted Liss as Sweatshop Foreman
 Bruce Vilanch as Dress Manufacturer
 Don Howard as Dress Manufacturer
 Albert Rosenberg as Dress Manufacturer
 Marvin Corman as Cab Driver
 E. Rodney Jones as Radio Announcer (voice)
 Dan Daniel as Giuseppe (as Daniel Daniele)
 Princess Irene Galitzine as herself
 Jacques Stany as Auctioneer – Fashion Show

Soundtrack
Mahogany was the second original motion picture soundtrack by Diana Ross, following her 1972 release Lady Sings the Blues. The soundtrack included the single "Theme from Mahogany (Do You Know Where You're Going To)", which peaked at number-one on the Billboard Hot 100 chart in January 1976. The single's B-side, "No One's Gonna Be a Fool Forever", was taken from Diana's "Last Time I Saw Him" album of 1973. The soundtrack reached #19 in the USA and sold over 275,000 copies.

Track listing
All tracks composed by Michael Masser; except where indicated

Side one
"Theme from Mahogany (Do You Know Where You're Going To)" (lyrics: Gerry Goffin) – 3:25
"Feeling Again" – 3:22
"You Don't Ever Have to Be Alone" – 2:40
"Can You Hear It in My Music" – 3:38
"Christian's Theme" – 1:46
"After You" – 2:17
"Theme from Mahogany" (Instrumental) – 3:52

Side two
"My Hero Is a Gun" – 3:18
"Cat Fight" (Gil Askey) – 1:31
"Erucu" (Don Daniels, Jermaine Jackson) – 3:34
"Let's Go Back to Day One" (Gil Askey, Gloria Jones, Patrice Holloway) – 1:42
"Tracy" (Gil Askey) – 2:14
"She's the Ideal Girl" (Don Daniels, Jermaine Jackson) – 2:46
"Sweets (And Other Things)" – 2:01
"Mahogany Suite" – 5:31

Charts

Weekly charts

Year-end charts

Release and reception
On Rotten Tomatoes the film has an approval rating of 30% based on reviews from 20 critics.

Mahogany was released on VHS home video in the 1990s, and was issued on DVD on May 1, 2007.

Awards and nominations

The film is recognized by the American Film Institute in this list:
 2004: AFI's 100 Years...100 Songs:	
 "Theme from Mahogany (Do You Know Where You're Going To)" – Nominated

See also
 List of American films of 1975

References

External links
 
 
 
 

1975 films
1975 LGBT-related films
1975 romantic drama films
1970s English-language films
African-American drama films
African-American LGBT-related films
African-American romance films
American romantic drama films
Films about fashion
Films set in Chicago
Films set in Rome
Films shot in Chicago
Films shot in Rome
LGBT-related romantic drama films
Motown Productions films
Paramount Pictures films
1970s American films